Double-stranded RNA-binding protein Staufen homolog 2 is a protein that in humans is encoded by the STAU2 gene.

Function 

Staufen homolog 2 is a member of the family of double-stranded RNA (dsRNA)-binding proteins involved in the transport and/or localization of mRNAs to different subcellular compartments and/or organelles.  These proteins are characterized by the presence of multiple dsRNA-binding domains which are required to bind RNAs having double-stranded secondary structures.  Staufen homolog 2 shares 48.5% and 59.9% similarity with drosophila and human staufen, respectively.  The exact function of Staufen homolog 2 is not known, but since it contains 3 copies of conserved dsRNA binding domain, it could be involved in double-stranded RNA binding events. Expression of Stau2 was sufficient to increase eye size, suggesting a novel biological role of Stau2 in eye morphogenesis.
Acting as a HIV-1 dependency factor, Staufen-2 promotes HIV-1 proliferation by positively regulating RNA export activity of viral protein Rev  and recently it was reported that Staufen-2 is incorporated into HIV-1 particles and  boost viral infectivity

References

Further reading